Trigoniodendron is a genus of flowering plants belonging to the family Trigoniaceae.

Its native range is Southeastern Brazil.

Species:
 Trigoniodendron spiritusanctense E.F.Guim. & Miguel

References

Trigoniaceae
Malpighiales genera